Joseph Carl Firrantello (December 16, 1937 – January 10, 1986), known as Joe Farrell, was an American jazz multi-instrumentalist who primarily performed as a saxophonist and flutist. He is best known for a series of albums under his own name on the CTI record label and for playing in the initial incarnation of Chick Corea's Return to Forever.

Early life and education
Farrell was born in Chicago Heights, Illinois. As a child, Farrell began playing the flute and clarinet. After graduating from the University of Illinois at Urbana–Champaign in 1959, he moved to New York City to work as a freelance musician.

Career 
He joined the Ralph Marterie Band in 1957 and later played with Maynard Ferguson and The Thad Jones/ Mel Lewis Orchestra. He also recorded with Charles Mingus, Andrew Hill, Jaki Byard, Players Association and Elvin Jones. After the death of John Coltrane, Elvin Jones formed a pianoless trio with Jimmy Garrison and Farrell, recording two albums for Blue Note in 1968.

In the late 1960s and throughout the 1970s, Farrell performed with Chick Corea and Return to Forever. He is the flutist in Corea's most famous work "Spain," which is considered to be a modern jazz standard.

He did numerous sessions and contributed a flute solo to Aretha Franklin's 1973 hit "Until You Come Back to Me (That's What I'm Gonna Do)". The Santana track "When I Look into Your Eyes" (from Welcome [1973]) includes prominent flute solos from Farrell. During this period, he also contributed tenor saxophone and oboe solos to Hall & Oates' Abandoned Luncheonette (1973). Some of the most famous funk singles of James Brown feature Farrell as a part of the horn section.

In 1976, Joe recorded a duo album with George Benson called Benson & Farrell  on CTI Records.

Farrell recorded Flute Talk with Sam Most in 1979, which was billed as a duet of the world's two greatest jazz flutists.

Farrell performs with Brazilian percussionist Airto and Airto's wife Flora Purim on the album Three-Way Mirror. A message on the CD jacket dedicates the 1987 album to Farrell and states it contains his final recordings.

Death 
Farrell died of myelodysplastic syndrome (MDS) in Duarte, California, on January 10, 1986, at the age of 48.

Legacy 
In 2008, Farrell's daughter Kathleen Firrantello filed a lawsuit against rappers Kanye West, Method Man, Redman and Common, and their respective record labels, for allegedly using portions of Farrell's 1974 musical composition "Upon This Rock" in their songs without approval. Firrantello was seeking punitive damages of at least US$1 million and asked that no further copies of the songs be made, sold or performed.

Discography

As leader
 1967: Jazz for a Sunday Afternoon (Live at the Village Vanguard) with Chick Corea, others (Solid State)
 1970: Joe Farrell Quartet with Chick Corea, John McLaughlin (CTI)
 1971: Outback (CTI)
 1972: Moon Germs (CTI)
 1973: Penny Arcade (CTI)
 1974: Upon This Rock (CTI)
 1975: Canned Funk (CTI)
 1976: Benson & Farrell with George Benson (CTI)
 1977: La Catedral Y El Toro (Warner Bros.)
 1978: Night Dancing (Warner Bros.)
 1979: Skate Board Park (Xanadu)
 1980: Sonic Text (Contemporary)
 1980: Farrell's Inferno (Contemporary)
 1982: Darn That Dream (Quartet/Quintet with Art Pepper, George Cables, Tony Dumas, John Dentz) (Real Time; reissue: Drive Archive)
 1983: Vim 'n' Vigor with Louis Hayes (Timeless)
 1985: Clark Woodard and Joe Farrell with Clark Woodard (BCS)
 1985: Three-Way Mirror with Airto Moreira, Flora Purim (Reference Recordings)

As sideman
With Mose Allison
Hello There, Universe (Atlantic, 1970)
Your Mind Is on Vacation (Atlantic, 1976)
With Patti Austin
End of a Rainbow (CTI, 1976)
With Average White Band
 AWB (Atlantic, 1974)
With The Band
 Rock of Ages (Capitol, 1972)
With Ray Barreto
 La Cuna (CTI, 1979 [1981])
With the Bee Gees
Main Course (RSO, 1975) 
With George Benson
Tell It Like It Is (A&M/CTI, 1969)
Good King Bad (CTI, 1975)
With Willie Bobo
Bobo's Beat (Roulette, 1962)
With Frank Butler
Wheelin' and Dealin' (Xanadu, 1978)
With Jaki Byard
 Jaki Byard Quartet Live! (Prestige, 1965)
 The Last from Lennie's (Prestige, 1965 [2003])
With George Cables
Circle (Contemporary, 1979 [1985])
With Billy Cobham
 Spectrum (Atlantic, 1973)
With Chick Corea / Return to Forever
 Tones for Joan's Bones (Vortex, 1966)
 Return to Forever (ECM, 1972)
 Light as a Feather (Polydor, 1972)
 The Leprechaun (Polydor, 1976)
 Musicmagic (Columbia, 1977)
 Live (Columbia, 1977)
 The Mad Hatter (Polydor, 1978)
 Secret Agent (Polydor, 1978)
 Friends (Polydor, 1978)
 Tap Step (Warner Bros., 1980)
With Lou Donaldson
 Sophisticated Lou (Blue Note, 1973)
With Maynard Ferguson
Newport Suite (Roulette, 1960)
Let's Face the Music and Dance (Roulette, 1960)
 Maynard '61 (Roulette, 1961)
Double Exposure with Chris Connor (Atlantic, 1961)
Two's Company with Chris Connor (Roulette, 1961)
 Maynard '64 (Roulette, 1959–1962 [1963]) note: 1 track only
 Primal Scream (Columbia, 1976)
 Conquistador (Columbia, 1977)
With Aretha Franklin
Let Me in Your Life (Atlantic, 1973)
With Fuse One
 Fuse One (CTI, 1980)
With Grant Green
 The Main Attraction (Kudu, 1976)
With Urbie Green
The Fox (CTI, 1976)
With Bobby Hackett
Creole Cookin' (Verve, 1967)
With Slide Hampton
Explosion! The Sound of Slide Hampton (Atlantic, 1962)
With Andrew Hill 
 Dance with Death (Blue Note, 1968 [1980])
 Passing Ships (Blue Note, 1969 [2003])
With Johnny Hodges
3 Shades of Blue (Flying Dutchman, 1970)
With Jackie and Roy
A Wilder Alias (CTI, 1973)
With Antônio Carlos Jobim
 Stone Flower (CTI, 1970)
 Tide (A&M, 1970)
 Urubu (Warner Bros., 1976)
With Elvin Jones
 Puttin' It Together (Blue Note, 1968)
 The Ultimate (Blue Note, 1968)
Poly-Currents (Blue Note, 1970)
Genesis (Blue Note, 1971)
Merry-Go-Round (Blue Note, 1971)
New Agenda (Vanguard, 1975)
 With The Thad Jones/Mel Lewis Orchestra
Presenting Thad Jones/Mel Lewis and the Jazz Orchestra (Solid State, 1966)
Live at the Village Vanguard (Solid State, 1967)
Monday Night (Solid State, 1968)
Central Park North (Solid State, 1969)
Consummation (Solid State, 1970)With Rufus JonesFive on Eight (Cameo, 1964)With Lee KonitzChicago 'n All That Jazz (Groove Merchant, 1975)With John Larkin John Larkin (Transition, 1986)With Jeff Lorber Fusion Soft Space (Inner City, 1978)
 Water Sign (Arista, 1979)With Arif MardinJourney (Atlantic, 1974)With Pat Martino Strings! (Prestige, 1967)With Jack McDuffThe Fourth Dimension (Cadet, 1974)
Sophisticated Funk (Chess, 1976)With Charles MingusPre-Bird (aka Mingus Revisited) (Mercury, 1960)With Mingus DynastyChair in the Sky (Elektra, 1979)
Live at Montreux (Atlantic, 1980)With Blue MitchellMany Shades of Blue (Mainstream, 1974)With James MoodyThe Blues and Other Colors (Milestone, 1969)With Airto MoreiraFree (CTI, 1972)With Laura NyroEli and the Thirteenth Confession (Columbia, 1968)
Christmas and the Beads of Sweat (Columbia, 1970)With Dizzy ReeceAsia Minor (Prestige, 1962)With SantanaWelcome (Columbia, 1973)With Lalo SchifrinBlack Widow (CTI, 1976)
Towering Toccata (CTI, 1976)With Don SebeskyGiant Box (CTI, 1973)With Dakota StatonI Want a Country Man (Groove Merchant, 1973)With Bobby TimmonsGot to Get It! (Milestone, 1967)With Allen Vizzutti'Allen Vizzutti (Headfirst, 1981)Skyrocket'' (Summit, 1995)

References

1937 births
1986 deaths
People from Chicago Heights, Illinois
Hard bop saxophonists
Crossover jazz saxophonists
American jazz flautists
American jazz saxophonists
American male saxophonists
Deaths from bone cancer
Deaths from cancer in California
Deaths from myelodysplastic syndrome
Return to Forever members
Warner Records artists
Xanadu Records artists
Timeless Records artists
American people of Italian descent
American jazz musicians
20th-century British musicians
20th-century American saxophonists
Jazz musicians from Illinois
20th-century American male musicians
American male jazz musicians
Mingus Dynasty (band) members
The Thad Jones/Mel Lewis Orchestra members
CTI Records artists
20th-century flautists